Erica Risseeuw (born 11 July 1990 in Calgary, Alberta) is a Canadian former competitive pair skater who competed for Great Britain with British partner Robert Paxton. They are the 2009 & 2010 British silver medalists.

Competitive highlights
(with Paxton)

References

 

1990 births
Living people
British female pair skaters
Figure skaters from Calgary